The 2014–15 VfL Bochum season was the 77th season in club history.

Review and events
On 9 December 2014 head coach Peter Neururer was sacked and replaced by caretaker Frank Heinemann. On 22 December 2014 the VfL Bochum announced signing Gertjan Verbeek as head coach, starting 1 January 2015.

Matches

Legend

Friendly matches

2. Bundesliga

League fixtures and results

League table

DFB-Pokal

Squad

Squad and statistics

Squad, appearances and goals scored

|}

Transfers

Summer

In:

Out:

Winter

In:

Out:

Sources

External links
 2014–15 VfL Bochum season at Weltfussball.de 
 2014–15 VfL Bochum season at kicker.de 
 2014–15 VfL Bochum season at Fussballdaten.de 

Bochum
VfL Bochum seasons